Growing Pains: Return of the Seavers (also known as Growing Pains II: Home Equity) is a 2004 American made-for-television comedy film and is the second (and to date, last) reunion film of the modern-day Seaver family from the 1985–1992 sitcom Growing Pains. It was filmed in New Orleans, LA, and originally aired on ABC October 16, 2004.

Plot 
The Seaver children have left the nest and have children of their own. Mike, Carol, and Chrissy have no place to go when Kate is at a spa, Scott is out on a campaign, and Chrissy claims to have been evicted. Jason and Maggie plan to sell their house to a childhood friend of Mike and Carol's named Richie Flanscopper. Acting as the realtor, Ben is dead set on selling the house, but the rest of the Seaver kids object. Mike and Carol (who is pregnant) take matters into their own hands and sabotage the house so their little brother can't sell it to Richie and his wife Fiona. Meanwhile, Mike's oldest child, Michelle, is sad about her dad going to Tokyo for a job promotion. In the end, Ben realizes that his siblings and parents don't want to sell the house, so he makes the house unsellable by driving Mike's car through the garage door. The Seavers rejoice, until Carol goes into labor. Carol gives birth to a son, named Seaver Malone Johnson.

Cast

Main
 Alan Thicke as Jason Seaver
 Joanna Kerns as Maggie Seaver
 Kirk Cameron as Mike Seaver
 Tracey Gold as Carol Seaver
 Jeremy Miller as Ben Seaver
 Ashley Johnson as Chrissy Seaver
 Chelsea Noble as Kate Seaver
 Evan Arnold as Richie Flanscopper
 Brittany Robertson as Michelle Seaver
 Robert Treveiler as 
 J. Patrick McNamara as 
 Natalija Nogulich as

Co-Starring
Kelly Collins Lintz as Fiona
Johnny Alonso as Mickey
Mi'cah Ducros as Sara
Kelly Ford as Anna
Justin Dubose as Ritchie

Featuring
John McConnell as Frontman
Michael Arata as Exterminator
Billy Slaughter as Grocery Clerk
Mike Mito as Sushi Chef
P.J. Davis as
Douglas Griffin as Young sale Buyer
Bernard Hi]ocke as Bargain Hunter #2
Jerry Lee Laughton as RV Salesman
Peter Gable as

Home media
A manufacture-on-demand DVD was released through Warner Archive Collection on December 6, 2011.

References

External links 
 
 Growing Pains: Return of the Seavers at Fandango.com
 Growing Pains: Return of the Seavers at TV Guide

2004 television films
2004 films
2004 comedy films
American comedy television films
American sequel films
2000s English-language films
Television series reunion films
Television sequel films
Films shot in New Orleans
Films based on television series
Return of the Seavers
Television films based on television series
2000s American films